Imre Győrffy (born 24 December 1905, date of death unknown) was a Hungarian cyclist. He competed in the sprint event at the 1936 Summer Olympics.

References

External links
 

1905 births
Year of death missing
Hungarian male cyclists
Olympic cyclists of Hungary
Cyclists at the 1936 Summer Olympics
Cyclists from Budapest